Serixia praeusta is a species of beetle in the family Cerambycidae. It was described by Francis Polkinghorne Pascoe in 1867.

References

Serixia
Beetles described in 1867